John Lambe (born 1944 in Fordingbridge, Hampshire) otherwise known as the M5 rapist is a British serial rapist who worked as a builder and lorry driver.

From 1975 until his arrest in 1980, he was responsible for a string of sex attacks on women aged between 15–74 in the Bristol and Taunton areas which adjoin the M5 motorway in South West England.

He was arrested after the husband of one of his victims recognised him and his vehicle leaving the scene of the crime in Taunton.

In 1981, he was found guilty of twelve counts of rape and six charges of attempted rape and jailed for life. The prosecution at his trial alleged that the motivation for his crimes stemmed from a vitriolic hatred of the police against whom he had waged a personal vendetta since a conviction for aggravated burglary in 1975.

References

English people convicted of rape
1944 births
Living people
British people convicted of attempted rape
British people convicted of burglary